Cheryl L. West (born October 23, 1965, Chicago) is an American playwright.

Life
West holds a degree from the University of Illinois at Champaign-Urbana. She worked as a social worker and taught before turning to playwriting.

In 1990, she came to Seattle for The Group Theatre's Multicultural Playwrights Festival, where she won the opportunity to workshop her play, Before It Hits Home. That play went on to be produced at Arena Stage. On June 12, 1991, her play Jar the Floor had its world premiere at Seattle's The Empty Space Theater. In 1999, she relocated to Seattle.

She won a National Endowment for the Arts Playwrighting Award for 1995–96. Also making a successful foray into film, her play Before It Hits Home has been optioned by Spike Lee; and she has been asked to pen a film adaptation for Home Box Office and write an original screenplay for Paramount Studios. She had been commissioned to write a dramatic adaptation of Richard Wright's 1940 novel Native Son.

A film version of her play Holiday Heart premiered on Showtime in 2000, starring Ving Rhames and Alfre Woodard.

In 2012, the Seattle Repertory Theatre premiered her play Pullman Porter Blues. In 2017, the Pasadena Playhouse premiered her play Shout Sister Shout!

Awards
 Before It Hits Home Susan Smith Blackburn Prize Co-winner, 1990, AUDELCO Award for Outstanding Play, 1991, Helen Hayes Charles McArthur Award Winner, Outstanding New Play, 1992
 Jar the Floor, Beverly Hills/Hollywood NAACP Best Play, 1995

Works

Plays
 Before It Hits Home - 1991 
 
 Puddin 'n Pete – 1993
 Holiday Heart – 1994
 Play On! – 1997
 Birdie Blue  – 2005
 Rejoice
 Addy: An American Girl Story
 Blues to the Bone
 Elocutia Does Pygmalion
 Pullman Porter Blues - 2012
 Lizzie Bright and the Buckminster Boy
 Squeeze, Hold Release
 Basketcases
 Mwindo
 Akeelah and the Bee
 Shout Sister Shout! – 2017
 Lady Jazz
 Last Stop on Market Street
 The Watsons Go to Birmingham
 Fannie - 2019
 Something Happened in Our Town - 2022

Teleplays
 Diary of a Single Mom (1 episode, 2009)
 Life Raft (2009) TV episode (writer)
 Glitter (2001) (story)
 Holiday Heart (2000) (TV) (teleplay)
 Play On! (2000) (TV) (writer)

References

External links

University of Illinois Urbana-Champaign alumni
20th-century American dramatists and playwrights
Writers from Chicago
Living people
1965 births
African-American dramatists and playwrights
American women dramatists and playwrights
20th-century American women writers
20th-century African-American women writers
20th-century African-American writers
21st-century African-American people
21st-century African-American women